Admiral Sir Frederick Robertson Parham, GBE, KCB, DSO (9 January 1901 – 20 March 1991) was a Royal Navy officer who went on to be Commander-in-Chief, The Nore.

Naval career
Educated at the Royal Naval College, Osborne, and the Royal Naval College, Dartmouth, Parham joined the Royal Navy as a cadet in 1913. He served in World War I as a midshipman on HMS Malaya. In 1937 he was given command of HMS Shikari.

He saw active service in the Second World War as Captain of the destroyer HMS Gurkha, which was sunk by enemy action in 1940. From 1942 he had command of the cruiser  which remains permanently moored as a museum ship in London.

After the War Parham commanded the battleship HMS Vanguard and then, in 1949 became Deputy Chief of Naval Personnel. He was made Flag Officer (Flotillas) and Second in Command of the Mediterranean Fleet in 1951 and Fourth Sea Lord and Chief of Supplies and Transport in 1954. Finally he was made Commander-in-Chief, The Nore, in 1955. He retired in 1959.

In retirement Parham chaired a Parliamentary Committee on Inland Waterways.

Family
In 1926, he married Kathleen Dobrée; they had one son. Following the death of his first wife, he married Joan Charig Saunders in 1978.

References

External links
Imperial War Museum Interview

|-

1901 births
1991 deaths
Royal Navy personnel of World War I
People educated at the Royal Naval College, Osborne
Graduates of Britannia Royal Naval College
Royal Navy officers of World War I
Military personnel from Somerset
People from Bath, Somerset
Royal Navy admirals
Knights Grand Cross of the Order of the British Empire
Knights Commander of the Order of the Bath
Companions of the Distinguished Service Order
Lords of the Admiralty